Ramón Armando Heredia Ruarte (born 26 February 1951 in Córdoba) is an Argentine former football defender who played for the Argentina national team.

Heredia started his playing career in 1969 with San Lorenzo in Argentina. He was part of the squad that won both league titles in 1972. He joined Atlético Madrid in 1973 and played in the 1974 European Cup Final. An undisputed starter in his first three years, he lost his regular place in the 4th due to injuries (as atletico won the league title). He then moved to Paris Saint-Germain, where again he would be used rarely. After two seasons with the latter, he chose to retire.

Heredia, (nicknamed Cacho) played 30 times for Argentina, including appearances at the 1974 FIFA World Cup.

After he retired from playing, Heredia became a football coach. He began by managing CD Toledo and Real Ávila CF, before he was appointed manager of Atlético Madrid in 1993. He also managed Cádiz CF and UD San Pedro.

Honours
 Atlético Madrid
Intercontinental Cup: 1974
Copa del Generalísimo: 1975-76
Spanish League: 1976-77

References

External links
weltfussball 

Profile

1951 births
Living people
Argentine footballers
Argentina international footballers
San Lorenzo de Almagro footballers
Atlético Madrid footballers
La Liga players
Paris Saint-Germain F.C. players
Argentine Primera División players
Ligue 1 players
Argentine expatriate footballers
Expatriate footballers in Spain
Expatriate footballers in France
Argentine expatriate sportspeople in France
Argentine expatriate sportspeople in Spain
1974 FIFA World Cup players
Argentine football managers
Argentine expatriate football managers
CD Toledo managers
Atlético Madrid managers
Cádiz CF managers
Association football defenders
Footballers from Córdoba, Argentina